Macrothyma is a genus of moths belonging to the subfamily Tortricinae of the family Tortricidae.

Species
Macrothyma sanguinolenta (Diakonoff, 1941)

See also
List of Tortricidae genera

References

External links
tortricidae.com

Tortricidae genera
Epitymbiini